On 6 March 2020, a mass shooting occurred in Kabul, Afghanistan. Two gunmen fired from a building that was under construction, killing 32 people and injuring another 81. It happened during a ceremony to commemorate the 25th anniversary of the murder by the Taliban of Afghan Shia leader Abdul Ali Mazari. The ceremony was attended by Afghan politician Abdullah Abdullah, who escaped unharmed. The two gunmen were killed later the same day. The Islamic State of Iraq and the Levant claimed responsibility for the attack.

See also
 List of terrorist attacks in Kabul

References

2020 murders in Afghanistan
2020 mass shootings in Asia
2020s in Kabul
ISIL terrorist incidents in Afghanistan
Mass murder in 2020
Terrorist incidents in Afghanistan in 2020
Terrorist incidents in Kabul
March 2020 crimes in Asia